Svishtiplaz ("windy place") is a Bulgarian mountain peak located in the Stara Planina range just north of Zlatitsa. The peak's elevation is 1888m above sea level. A nearby mountain hut is named after the mountain.

References

Balkan mountains
Landforms of Sofia Province
Mountains of Bulgaria